SERBA-2, short for selective estrogen receptor beta agonist-2, is a synthetic, nonsteroidal estrogen which acts as a selective ERβ agonist. For the ERα and ERβ, SERBA-2 has affinities (Ki) of 14.5 nM and 1.54 nM, efficacies of 85% and 100%, and EC50 values of 85 nM and 3.61 nM, respectively, demonstrating 9-fold binding selectivity and 11-fold functional selectivity for the ERβ over the ERα. An enantiomer of SERBA-2, erteberel (SERBA-1), is more potent and selective in comparison and is under development for the treatment of schizophrenia.

See also
 8β-VE2
 Diarylpropionitrile
 ERB-196
 Prinaberel
 WAY-200070

References

Benzopyrans
Diols
Selective ERβ agonists
Synthetic estrogens
Cyclopentanes